Carlo Braga (23 May 1889 – 3 January 1971) was a professed priest of the Salesians of Don Bosco and known as "the Little Don Bosco of China" for his missionary works towards the children in China. He died in the Philippines in 1971.

Biography
Don Braga was born in Tirano, Sondrio, on May 23, 1889. He grew up motherless since childhood and because of this his education was entrusted to the Salesians of Don Bosco in Sondrio. When he was seventeen, he entered the Salesians and took religious vows in Turin, Italy and he completed his studies in philosophy in Valsalice High School, where his instructors were Don Cimatti, the future apostle of Japan, and Don Cojazzi, a well known apostle of young people.

With the outbreak of the First World War, he was recruited in the army for three years, at the end of that he applied to be sent on a mission in the Far East.  When he reached Shiu Chow, in southern China, the first Salesian Bishop and Martyr, Monsignor Luigi Versiglia, who immediately sensed the good educational qualities of Don Braga, the Bishop entrusted the direction of the "Don Bosco Middle School" to him.

Don Braga, at the age of 40, was called to replace the Salesian Provincial, Fr Canazei, who was elected as bishop. The Salesian missions in China under his leadership brought forth orphanages and schools in Macao and in Hong Kong arose five large and modern schools with a student population of about 10,000 students.

He pushes bravely in northern China and implants the Salesian work in the capital Beijing: the work for orphans, for the poor and abandoned boys in those years many wandering the streets or starving. In Beijing he realizes the prophetic dream of Don Bosco who many years before had seen the Salesians settle in the vast capital.

The Salesian work of Don Braga, clearly expanding, saw his dreams were interrupted by Communism. Each education, charity and evangelization were closed. He then turned his attention to the Philippines and Indochina, where here he opened a Salesian school. Meanwhile, in 1955 he was elected Provincial. His zeal and enthusiasm inspires other missionaries. In the Philippines, the Salesian presence spread with extraordinary depth. Deep optimism, human kindness and cheerfulness were the main features of Don Braga. Everywhere he promoted a wonderful family spirit.

On 3 January 1971, he died at the age of 81 in Bacolor, Pampanga, Philippines.

Beatification
The cause for his beatification is already in the preliminary stages of the diocesan investigation but has not yet received the decree nihil obstat from the Congregation for the Causes of Saints. As of January 2019, ha has been declared a Servant of God.

References

1889 births
1971 deaths
Salesians of Don Bosco
Italian Servants of God
Filipino Servants of God
Salesian Servants of God
20th-century venerated Christians
People from the Province of Sondrio
Roman Catholic missionaries in China